Jasper Newton Wilkinson (September 19, 1851 – January 11, 1933) was an American educator and businessman, most notable for serving as the Kansas State Normal School's (KSN) sixth president in Emporia, Kansas.

Biography

Early life and education
Wilkinson, born September 19, 1851, to Jackson and Mary, began his career in education at sixteen. In 1874, Wilkinson graduated from Illinois Normal School. After graduating from college, Wilkinson was the principal of the Buda, Illinois school district until 1879. Wilkinson moved to Emporia, Kansas in 1884 to become a professor at the Normal school and later became vice-president.

Kansas State Normal presidency
Wilkinson took over as the Kansas State Normal School's sixth president on June 7, 1901, following Albert R. Taylor's resignation. Shortly after becoming president, Wilkinson decided that students who were failing would not continue at the Normal school and only those who completed a four-year program would graduate. In 1901, the school's first men's basketball event was played in Emporia. In 1903, a library opened, along with new bleachers for the football fields in 1905.

Later life
After resigning in June 1906 from the Normal School, Wilkinson bought and became the president of the Citizens Bank in Oklahoma until 1910. In January 1911, Wilkinson died.

References

External links
 

Presidents of Emporia State University
Illinois State University alumni
People from Vinton County, Ohio
1851 births
1933 deaths